Vincent Prieto (born September 11, 1960) is an American Democratic Party politician. He served in the New Jersey General Assembly from 2004 to 2018, where he represented the 32nd Legislative District. He formerly served as the 170th Speaker of the New Jersey General Assembly from 2014 to 2018. He was chair of the Hudson County Democratic Organization until 2018, when he was succeeded by Amy DeGise.

In February 2018, it was announced that Prieto would step down from the Assembly and succeed Wayne Hasenbalg as president and chief executive officer of the New Jersey Sports and Exposition Authority, The Sports and Exposition Authority operates the Sports Complex in East Rutherford, New Jersey."Vincent Prieto stepping down, will lead New Jersey Sports & Exposition Authority", The Record (Bergen County), February 15, 2018. Accessed February 17, 2018. "Assemblyman Vincent Prieto, D–Secaucus, is stepping down from his Assembly seat to take a new job as president and CEO of the New Jersey Sports & Exposition Authority.... The NJSEA Board of Commissioners approved Prieto’s appointment, with an annual salary of $280,000, on Thursday morning. The move comes at the recommendation of Gov. Phil Murphy."</ref>

Biography
Prieto is a Cuban-American. In 1971, he and his mother took a Freedom Flight (air-lift resettlement program offering alien resident status to Cuban exiles) and moved to North Hudson County at a time when it was known as Havana on the Hudson.

He attended Middlesex County College receiving a degree in construction code technology and Bergen Community College where he received a degree for fire code technology. Outside of his legislative and political duties, he is the construction code official for the Town of Secaucus. He is a resident of Secaucus with his wife Marlene and two children.

Political career
Prieto served on the Secaucus Planning Board from 1998 to 2001. He was selected by Hudson County Democratic Party leaders in December 2004 to fill the vacancy of Anthony Impreveduto, who resigned after pleading guilty to using campaign contributions for personal purposes. In the heavily Democratic-leaning 32nd district, he has not faced significant opposition in any general election since being appointed.

He garnered the support of 41 of 48 colleagues and became the Assembly Speaker in November 2013 replacing Sheila Oliver. He is the second Cuban-American to lead the Assembly after fellow Hudson County Democrat Albio Sires.

Prieto serves as the Chairman of the Legislative Services Commission. Prieto served in the Assembly as the Deputy Majority Whip from 2006 to 2011. He previously served in the Assembly as chair on the Budget Committee, the Budget Oversight Committee, and the Regulated Professions Committee; he was also a member of the Appropriations Committee,  the Transportation Committee, the Public Works Committee, and the Independent Authorities Committee.

In 2013 the Hudson Reporter ranked him #7 in its list of Hudson County's 50 most influential people, and #5 in 2015. He replaced Bayonne mayor Mark Smith as the chairman of the Hudson County Democratic Organization in 2013.

District 32
Each of the forty districts in the New Jersey Legislature has one representative in the New Jersey Senate and two members in the New Jersey General Assembly. The other representatives from the 32nd District for the 2014-2015 Legislative Session are:
Senator Nicholas Sacco
Assemblywoman Angelica M. Jimenez

References

External links
Assemblyman Prieto's legislative web page, New Jersey Legislature
New Jersey Legislature financial disclosure forms - 2016 2015 2014 2013 2012 2011 2010 2009 2008 2007 2006 2005 2004

1960 births
American politicians of Cuban descent
Hispanic and Latino American state legislators in New Jersey
Living people
Speakers of the New Jersey General Assembly
Democratic Party members of the New Jersey General Assembly
People from Secaucus, New Jersey
21st-century American politicians
Bergen Community College alumni
Middlesex County College alumni
New Jersey Sports and Exposition Authority executives